Sturry railway station is a railway station Kent, England, serving Sturry and Fordwich on the Ashford to Ramsgate line in Kent. The station and all trains serving it are operated by Southeastern.

Location and facilities
The station is north of Sturry village. It is also the nearest station to the town of Fordwich.

The two platforms are staggered and are either side of the A28 road which passes through a central level crossing. The A291 road to Herne Bay is also near the station. Platform 1 provides services towards ,  and London. This platform also has a part-time staffed booking office and ticket machines.

The unusual layout of the station has caused problems, as there is no direct pedestrian access between the two platforms. In 2020, a man was fined for trespassing by Network Rail when he jumped the level crossing barriers in order to make a train connection.

History
A booking office was added in 1851.

In 1887, the station was renamed Sturry for Herne Bay. It reverted to its original name around 1898.

The line through the station was electrified in 1962, with new services starting on 18 June.

Services
All services at Sturry are operated by Southeastern using  EMUs.

The typical off-peak service in trains per hour is:
 1 tph to London Charing Cross via 
 1 tph to 

During the peak hours, the station is also served by trains to London Cannon Street.

The station is also served by a single early morning service to London St Pancras International, operated by a  EMU.

References
Citations

Sources

External links

City of Canterbury
Railway stations in Kent
DfT Category E stations
Former South Eastern Railway (UK) stations
Railway stations in Great Britain opened in 1847
Railway stations served by Southeastern
1847 establishments in England